Labda may refer to:

 Lambda, a letter of the Greek alphabet
 Labda (mythology), a figure in Greek mythology

See also 
 Lambda (disambiguation)
 Lapda, an ancient town in Roman Africa